This is the discography of American musician Bootsy Collins.

Albums

Singles

Soundtracks
"I'd Rather Be with You", from the album Stretchin' Out in Bootsy's Rubber Band was featured in the movie Baby Boy.

Collins recorded music for the animated television series Loonatics Unleashed.

Collins co-wrote, with Lyle Workman and performed on several songs in the soundtrack to 2007‘s Superbad. He performed with a reunion of the original JBs rhythm section: Phelps Collins, Clyde Stubblefield and Jabo Starks, and supplemented by Bernie Worrell.

Other contributions
 In 1971, his band House Guests (a precursor to Bootsy's Rubber Band) recorded two, two-part singles, "What So Never The Dance" and "My Mind Set Me Free".
 In 1977, he played on the album A Blow for Me, a Toot to You by Fred Wesley and the Horny Horns.
 In 1978, he played on Bernie Worrell's album All the Woo in the World.
 In 1978, he played on Parlet's album Pleasure Principle.
 In 1979, he played on Parlet's album Invasion of the Booty Snatchers.
 In 1979, he played on the album Say Blow by Blow Backwards by Fred Wesley and the Horny Horns.
 In 1980, he played on Parlet's album Play Me or Trade Me.
 In 1980, he played on Zapp's album Zapp.
 In 1981, he produced and played on Godmoma's album Godmoma Here
 In 1987, he produced Mico Wave's sole album Cookin' from the Inside, Out!, from which two tracks ("Instant Replay" and "Misunderstood") appeared on the compilation album 6 Degrees of P-Funk (The Best of George Clinton and His Funk Family) under the artist "George Clinton & the P-Funk All Stars".
 In 1988, Bootsy co-produced (alongside George Clinton) the album Lifestyles of the Roach and Famous by INCorporated Thang Band (a P-Funk spin-off).
 In 1988, Collins played bass on "Big Enough", the first song on Keith Richards' album Talk Is Cheap.
 In 1990, he played guitar, bass, and contributed guest vocals on Deee-Lite's album World Clique, most notably on "Groove Is in the Heart", which hit No. 4 on the Billboard Hot 100.
 In 1990, he appeared on a track on Maceo Parker's album Roots Revisited.
 In 1990, he played on Bernie Worrell's album Funk of Ages.
 In 1991, he contributed bass and backing vocals to the album The Third Power by Material.
 In 1992, he produced Buckethead's first album Bucketheadland.
 In 1993, he played bass and guitar on the Last Poets' album Holy Terror.
 In 1993, he played on Bernie Worrell's album Blacktronic Science.
 In 1994, he contributed to the Soup Dragons' last album, Hydrophonic.
 In 1994, he played on the album The Final Blow by Fred Wesley and the Horny Horns.
 In 1995, he and other P-Funk members recorded the album Funkcronomicon under the name Axiom Funk.
 In 1996, Collins collaborated on George Clinton's album T.A.P.O.A.F.O.M.
 In 1996, he mixed an alternate take of the song "Silver City Children" (known as the 'Hip-notic Boot-si-phonic Mix') from SHAG's album Silver City.
 In 1999, Collins co-wrote "DJ Droga" with Argentinian funk duo Illya Kuryaki and the Valderramas for their album Leche
 In 1999, he appeared on Buckethead's album Monsters and Robots.
 In 2001, Collins provided vocals to the song "Weapon of Choice" from Fatboy Slim's album Halfway Between the Gutter and the Stars.
In 2001, Collins provided bass and vocals for the song "Tear Me Down", on Gov't Mule's The Deep End Volume 1.
 In 2002, he appeared on the album The Exodus by Gospel Gangstaz.
 In 2002, Collins provided vocals to the title track on Fatboy Slim's EP Illuminati. He read a poem at the end of FatBoy Slims's release in the Late Night Tales DJ mix series.
 In 2002, Collins worked with the Lo Fidelity Allstars on their album Don't Be Afraid of Love. He has recorded with Praxis and with Buckethead on several occasions.
 In 2004, Collins performed on the title track on TobyMac's album Welcome to Diverse City.
 In 2004, he appeared on Nicole C. Mullen's album, Everyday People.
 In 2004, he appeared on Snoop Dogg's Rhythm & Gangsta album.
 In 2004, Collins was featured on the album True Love by Toots and the Maytals.
 In 2004, he performed a cover of "Power of Soul" on the tribute album Power of Soul: A Tribute to Jimi Hendrix.
 In 2009, Collins collaborated with Reflection Eternal, a duo made up of Talib Kweli and Hi-Tek, on the track "Internet Connection".
 In 2013, Collins was featured on the album "Defenders of the Faith" by the band Gospel Gangstaz.
 In 2017, Collins appears on "Captain Hook", the last song on Vulfpeck's album Mr. Finish Line. 
 In 2018, Collins sang and played bass on "After The Storm" by Kali Uchis.
 In 2018, Collins appeared with Buckethead on two songs on Japanese metal band ASTERISM's album IGNITION.
 In 2020, Collins appeared on "We Play the Funk" by Five Alarm Funk.
 In 2021, Collins was featured on multiple songs by Silk Sonic, a duo made up of Bruno Mars and Anderson .Paak, on their album An Evening with Silk Sonic.

Promotional videos
 Party on Plastic (What's Bootsy Doin'?) (1988)
 Undercova' Funk (Give Up the Funk) (feat. Snoop Dogg) (2002)
 Play With Bootsy (2002)

Notes

References

Discographies of American artists
Rhythm and blues discographies
Funk music discographies